Scharten is a municipality in the district of Eferding in the Austrian state of Upper Austria.

Geography
Scharten lies in the Hausruckviertel. About 11 percent of the municipality is forest and 75 percent farmland.

See also
Schartner Bombe

References

Cities and towns in Eferding District